The 2022 Parramatta Eels season was the 76th in the club's history. Coached by Brad Arthur and co-captained by Clinton Gutherson and Junior Paulo, they will compete in the NRL's 2022 Telstra Premiership. The season saw a club record membership tally of 34,264.

Summary
Parramatta finished the 2022 regular season in fourth place. Along the way, the club defeated Penrith the defending premiers twice, the first of which was a 22-20 victory at Penrith Stadium which ended their long winning streak at the ground. The club also defeated Melbourne both home and away. Although the club finished within the top four, many pundits and experts wrote off Parramatta's premiership chances. In week one of the finals, Parramatta were beaten 27-8 by Penrith with Mitchell Moses being taken off injured in the second half. The following week in the elimination final, Parramatta comfortably defeated Canberra 40-4. This would set up a preliminary final meeting against North Queensland in Townsville. Parramatta headed into the game as outsiders but pulled off one of the biggest upsets in 2022 and NRL finals history defeating North Queensland 24-20. In the 2022 NRL Grand Final, Parramatta played against fellow Western Sydney club Penrith. Parramatta would go into the half-time break 18-0 down and would eventually lose 28-12 with Clinton Gutherson and Jakob Arthur scoring Parramatta's tries.

Squad information
The playing squad and coaching staff of the Parramatta Eels for the 2022 NRL season.

Transfers

In:

Out:

Pre-season

Home and away season

League table

Result by round

Matches

Finals series

Bracket

Matches

References 

Parramatta Eels seasons
Parramatta Eels season
2022 NRL Women's season